John Biggar (born 1964) is a Scottish mountaineer, high altitude mountain guide and explorer, mainly active in the Andes. From 1995 to the present day he has made a number of first ascents in the Andes. He discovered the Inca ruins on the summit of Alto Toroni, a 5995m high peak on the frontier between Chile and Bolivia and was first to realise that a small lake on Ojos del Salado was the world's highest lake.
As of 2020, Biggar has climbed 54 major and 17 less prominent peaks of over 6000 m in the Andes, the second highest total of anyone, after Maximo Kausch.

Andean 6000m peak list 
Biggar was the first to compile a regularised and comprehensive list of the 6000 m high peaks of the Andes, using a fixed prominence cut-off. His list, first published in November 1996, was compiled using IGM mapping. Originally there were 99 peaks on the list. Subsequent revisions using satellite topography data such as that provided by the Shuttle Radar Topography Mission, have resulted in a list of 100 peaks in the 4th edition.

First ascents 
Biggar has made first ascents in the Andes of six 6000m+ peaks and ten 5000 m+ peaks. These ascents have been in several different ranges, including a 2005 expedition to the Cordillera Carabaya of Peru, a January 2010 ascent of Medusa Northeast and a November 2011 expedition to the Cordon de los Pioneros in Argentina

Other ascents 
Climbing Mercedario in January 2004, Biggar became the second person, after Dario Bracali to have climbed the ten highest peaks in the Andes. In February 2007 with an ascent of Incahuasi he became the second person to have climbed the worlds ten highest volcanoes, again after Dario Bracali.
In December 2015 Biggar organised an international expedition that was the first for over 20 years to climb Pico Cristobal Colon, the highest peak in Colombia.

References

Scottish mountain climbers
1964 births
Living people
Alumni of the University of Edinburgh
People from St Bees